The Fort Riley Limestone is a Permian stratigraphic unit and historic building stone, sold commercially as fine-grained Silverdale, at one time being quarried at Silverdale, Kansas. The limestone outcrops in east-central Kansas, northeast-central Oklahoma, and southeastern Nebraska in the Midwestern United States. Its outcrop caps the bluffs overlooking the original buildings of Fort Riley.

See also

 List of fossiliferous stratigraphic units in Kansas
 List of fossiliferous stratigraphic units in Nebraska
 List of fossiliferous stratigraphic units in Oklahoma
 Paleontology in Kansas
 Paleontology in Nebraska
 Paleontology in Oklahoma

References

External links
 Stratigraphic Nomenclature

Permian Kansas
Permian geology of Nebraska
Geologic formations of Oklahoma
Limestone
Building stone